The EuroBasket 2015 Final was the championship game of the EuroBasket 2015 tournament. The game was played on 20 September 2015 at the Stade Pierre-Mauroy in Lille, France.

Spain won their third title by defeating Lithuania 80–63. The attendance of 27,372 was an all-time record. Both teams qualified for the 2016 Summer Olympics.

Road to the Final

Spain
The team of Spain for EuroBasket 2015 missed Serge Ibaka, Marc Gasol and José Calderón, compared to the squad that participated at the 2014 FIBA Basketball World Cup. Pau Gasol did play for the team, as well as Nikola Mirotić, who made his debut with the Spanish national team.  

Spain started slow at the tournament, during the group stage in Berlin. Spain lost to Serbia and Italy, and had to battle on the last day with Germany to eventually advance to the Round of 16. In the quarterfinals Greece, who were considered major tournament contenders, was defeated 73–71. In the semi-final Spain faced host country France, who knocked Spain out of the tournament at the 2010 World Cup. Behind 40 points from Pau Gasol, the Spanish put the French away after overtime.

Lithuania
Top players Linas Kleiza and Donatas Motiejūnas missed from the squad that participated 2014 FIBA Basketball World Cup. Lithuania played the group stage in Riga, Latvia. Their only loss came against Belgium, who won 74–76 on a buzzer-beater. In the Round of 16 Lithuania had its hands full with Georgia, but won 85–81 behind 34 points of Jonas Mačiulis. In the quarterfinals, they beat Italy after overtime. In the semifinals, they surprised favourite Serbia 67–64.

All results

Match
The game was a re-match of the EuroBasket 2003 final, in which Lithuania beat Spain 93–84. 

Spain pulled away early, by taking a 19–8 lead after the first quarter. Lithuania won the second quarter, behind a buzzer-beating three pointer by Jonas Mačiulis. After the third quarter, Spain led by 17 points.

After the game, Spain's Pau Gasol was named the Most Valuable Player of the tournament. Lithuanians Jonas Valančiūnas and Mačiulis were named to the All-Tournament Team along with Gasol and Sergio Rodríguez.

References

Final
2015
International basketball competitions hosted by France
2015
2015 Final
Lithuania–Spain relations
Final
EuroBasket 2015 Final
September 2015 sports events in France